Kristina Train (born January 17, 1982 in New York City as Kristina Beaty) is an American singer-songwriter and musician who lives in Nashville, having previously lived in London, United Kingdom. Her music blends influences from country, soul, gospel, blues, folk, and jazz.

Kristina was born in New York City and raised in Savannah, Georgia, where she and her mother moved to when she was 11 years old. She is of Norwegian, Italian, and Irish heritage. At the age of four, Kristina started studying classical violin. She sang in church and school choirs.  In 1999, she joined the soul outfit The Looters, often backing vocalist Rosa King on tour.

In 2001 Train played a showcase in New York City for Blue Note Records. Executives Bruce Lundvall and Arif Mardin subsequently invited Train to sign to Blue Note. Train left school to pursue music full-time, moving to New York and signing with Blue Note.

Career

2009: Spilt Milk

Train's debut album, Spilt Milk, was released on October 20, 2009. Blue Note had initially been interested in pairing her with Norah Jones producer Lee Alexander, but Train instead went to London and asked Jimmy Hogarth to produce the album.  Train co-wrote eight songs on the album, collaborating with Hogarth, Eg White, and Ed Harcourt. Train also arranged and overdubbed strings on three tracks. Kristina Train possesses a singing voice from another era... Her sound recalls Dusty Springfield, Aretha Franklin, and Laura Nyro… she lives up to the legacy of the great voices that inspired her. -NPR Music Spilt Milk is poised to make a big splash in the pop music world. Train's voice is husky, rich and dark with a big range and maturity of style that belies her age... She’s confident – and with good reason. She's got game. -Blurt

2012: Dark Black

On October 26, 2012, Train's album Dark Black was released for online purchases in the UK, and on November 5, 2012, the CD was released in the UK. The album, where she collaborated mainly with Ed Harcourt, Cherry Ghost's Simon Aldred, and Martin Craft, features "Train's dreamy, intense and intoxicating Southern American vocals." The BBC reviewed it as An extraordinary record from a singer previously overlooked. If you aren't in love with Train's voice by the end... there is something seriously wrong with your ears. -Huffington Post The album was released by Mercury Records (UK).

2021: Rayon City

Train announced via her Facebook page that she was working on her third album, Rayon City. She also posted two photos, including a black & white one of an exhibition-room marked "Rayon and Synthetic Yarns". Producer and composer Skylar Wilson is among those who worked on the album. The album Rayon City was released digitally on July 20, 2021.

Other projects

Train often plays with the band Scrapomatic and contributed vocals, violin, and songwriting on their 2006 album Alligator Love Cry, under the name of Kristina Beaty.

On October 10, 2007 Train performed at Carnegie Hall honoring Sir Elton John and Bernie Taupin for New York's Music For Youth.

In 2009, Train toured the United States with Chris Isaak, Susan Tedeschi, and Keb' Mo.

Train performed at the T.J Martell Foundation 34th Annual Awards Gala alongside Willie Nelson, Dianne Reeves, and Wynton Marsalis on October 28, 2009.

In 2009 and 2010 Train performed with Al Green, Tony Bennett, The Roots, and Darius Rucker.

Train contributed vocals to Marc Cohn's 2010 album Listening Booth, and contributed vocals and fiddle on Collin Rocker's 2010 debut album Milkbox Love, Jukebox Blood, & Other American Favorites.

Train toured the world with Herbie Hancock as his lead singer and violinist for nearly two years, with appearances on American television programs: The Tonight Show With Jay Leno, Late Show With David Letterman, Late Night With Jimmy Fallon, Larry King Live, Today, and Good Morning America. The band included musicians Lionel Loueke, Vinnie Colaiuta, James Genus, Pino Palladino, Tal Wilkenfeld, Greg Phillinganes, and Trevor Lawrence Jr.

Train performed at the bi-coastal 70th birthday celebration for Herbie Hancock which took place at New York's Carnegie Hall and Los Angeles' Hollywood Bowl alongside Wayne Shorter, Ron Carter, Jack DeJohnette, Dave Holland, Joe Lovano, Terence Blanchard, Wallace Roney, Zakir Hussain, Esperanza Spalding, Derek Trucks, Susan Tedeschi, Lisa Hannigan, Alex Acuña, Paulinho Da Costa, Juanes, Niladri Kumar, Bill Cosby, and Tavis Smiley.

Train co-wrote the closing track Salvation on Robert Randolph and the Family Band's album We Walk this Road which was produced by T-Bone Burnett.

On December 11, 2010 Train performed with Herbie Hancock, India.Arie, Florence and the Machine, Robyn, Colbie Caillat, and Barry Manilow at the Nobel Peace Prize Concert hosted by Denzel Washington and Anne Hathaway in Oslo, Norway.

In June 2011 Train collaborated with Dr. Dre in studio sessions for his forthcoming album, Detox.

On October 30, 2012 Train made her debut performance on Later... with Jools Holland on BBC 2.

Train was featured on the soundtrack of 2013 British Comedy I Give It A Year singing the Coldplay song, Sparks.

On January 30, 2013 Train was the first artist to sing live at the grand opening of The Shard marking this as the highest performance in Europe.

On March 7, 2013 Train made her debut performance at London's Royal Albert Hall with Ron Sexsmith.

Train is the voice of the Lexus Amazing In Motion 2013 global campaign, singing the song I'm Wandering previously released by Jackie Wilson (1958) and Aretha Franklin (1962).

Train sings Waltz With Me Under The Sun, the theme song of the 2013 film Queen of Carthage starring Shiloh Fernandez and Keisha Castle-Hughes.

Train is listed in as one of "10 New Artists You Need To Know Right Now" in the May 2014 issue of Rolling Stone Magazine.

She performed five songs on the soundtrack of the 2015 film Jenny's Wedding: True Love Avenue, Chase Me Away, Lost In Love, Sunny Side of the Street, and Baile Baile.

Kristina Train sang the songs "When the Shy Star" and "Sleep Now" (with Julian Lennon) on the album Goldenhair by Brian Byrne released in 2017.

Discography

Studio albums

References

External links

 

1982 births
Living people
Singers from New York City
Musicians from Savannah, Georgia
21st-century American women singers
21st-century American singers
Singer-songwriters from New York (state)
Singer-songwriters from Georgia (U.S. state)